Topawa (O'odham: name Ḍo Bawui translates as "Gathering Tepary Beans") is a census-designated place and unincorporated community in Pima County, Arizona, United States. The population was 315 as of the 2020 census. Topawa has a post office with ZIP code 85639.

Demographics
At the 2020 census there were 315 people, 101 households, and 70 families living in the CDP.  The population density was 61 people per square mile. There were 140 housing units.

The median household income was $23,929. The per capita income for the CDP was $12,559.

Geography
Baboquivari Unified School District operates Baboquivari Middle & High School just outside Topawa CDP.

Within the community is also located the San Solano Missions, the parish houses Catholic priests who serve the reservation.

Less than two miles from Topawa, the Tohono O'odham Nation also operates their Himdag Ki: Cultural Center and Museum.

References

Census-designated places in Pima County, Arizona
Census-designated places in Arizona
Unincorporated communities in Pima County, Arizona
Unincorporated communities in Arizona
Tohono O'odham Nation